Frank Beke (born 5 August 1946 in Ghent, Belgium) is a Flemish politician of the Socialistische Partij Anders. He served as Mayor of Ghent from 1995 to 2006, and as city councilor in the same city from 1983 to 2006.

References

External link

1946 births
Living people
Belgian politicians